Derin Tanrıyaşükür (born 21 October 2006) is a Turkish artistic gymnast.,

In 2019, she took gold medals in the Uneven bars and Floor exercise events and the bronze medal in the Individual all-around at the Juniors division of the Züri-Oberland Cup in Switzerland. She competed at the 2020 European Women's Artistic Gymnastics Championships in Mersin, Turkey, and won the bronze medal in the Uneven bars event of the Juniors division. She made history by winning the first medal of Turkish gymnastics history in the women's category.

References

External links
 

2006 births
Turkish female artistic gymnasts
People from Kadıköy
Sportspeople from Istanbul
Living people
21st-century Turkish women